Crassispira adana is a species of sea snail, a marine gastropod mollusk in the family Pseudomelatomidae.

Description
The length of the shell attains 12 mm.

Distribution
This species occurs in the Pacific Ocean from Manzanillo, Mexico-to Panama

References

External links
 
 

adana
Gastropods described in 1950